Shalom Schwarz (8 March 1951 - 16 October 2014) was an Israeli footballer who played most of his career for Hapoel Hadera and also won 11 caps for the Israel national football team.

Honours 
Israeli Second Division
Winners (3): 1969-70, 1972–73, 1976–77
Runner-up (1): 1968-69
AFC U-19 Championship
Winners (1): 1971

References

1951 births
2014 deaths
Israeli Jews
Israeli footballers
Hapoel Hadera F.C. players
Hapoel Haifa F.C. players
Beitar Tel Aviv F.C. players
Liga Leumit players
Israeli people of Romanian-Jewish descent
Asian Games silver medalists for Israel
Asian Games medalists in football
Association footballers not categorized by position
Footballers at the 1974 Asian Games
Medalists at the 1974 Asian Games